Jack Meadows may refer to:

 Jack Meadows (The Bill), a character on the TV series The Bill
 Jack Meadows (astronomer) (1934–2016), British astronomer and information scientist